8XK may refer to:

 Former experimental radio station established in Wilkinsburg, Pennsylvania in 1916 by Frank Conrad and deleted in 1924.
 Former Westinghouse shortwave radio station in East Pittsburgh, Pennsylvania, which changed its call sign from 8XAU in 1924.